Paruparo mamertina is a butterfly in the family Lycaenidae. It was described by William Chapman Hewitson in 1869. It is  found  in the Philippines in the Indomalayan realm.

Subspecies
P. m. mamertina  (Philippines)
P. m. rahmanni (Jumalon, 1975) (Leyte)
P. m. jeanhooperae Schröder & Treadaway, 1988 (Homonhon Island, Bitaugan)

References

External links
"Paruparo Takanami, 1982" at Markku Savela's Lepidoptera and Some Other Life Forms

Paruparo
Butterflies described in 1869
Butterflies of Asia
Taxa named by William Chapman Hewitson